Chaetonotus atrox is a species of gastrotrichs belonging to the family Chaetonotidae.

The species is native to Northern Europe. The species lives in marine environments.

References

atrox